Kashipur chakbibi is a gram panchayat in Hajipur,  Vaishali district, Bihar, India.

Geography

Villages in panchayat
There are  villages in this panchayat

References

Gram panchayats in Bihar
Villages in Vaishali district
Vaishali district
Hajipur